
Gmina Zelów is an urban-rural gmina (administrative district) in Bełchatów County, Łódź Voivodeship, in central Poland.

Villages
Apart from the town of Zelów, Gmina Zelów contains the villages and settlements of Bocianicha, Bujny Księże, Bujny Szlacheckie, Chajczyny, Dąbrowa, Faustynów, Grabostów, Grabostów-Bominy, Grębociny, Ignaców, Jamborek, Janów, Jawor, Karczmy, Karczmy-Kolonia, Kociszew, Kociszew A, Kolonia Grabostów, Kolonia Kociszew, Kolonia Ostoja, Krześlów, Kurów, Kurówek, Kuźnica, Łęki, Łęki-Kolonia, Łobudzice, Łobudzice-Kolonia, Marszywiec, Mauryców, Nowa Wola, Ostoja, Pawłowa, Podlesie, Pożdżenice, Pożdżenice-Kolonia, Przecznia, Pszczółki, Pukawica, Sobki, Sromutka, Tosin, Walewice, Wola Pszczółecka, Wygiełzów, Wypychów, Zabłoty, Zagłówki, Zalesie and Zelówek.

Neighbouring gminas
Gmina Zelów is bordered by the gminas of Bełchatów, Buczek, Dłutów, Drużbice, Kluki, Łask, Sędziejowice, Szczerców and Widawa.

References
Polish official population figures 2006

Zelow
Bełchatów County